Friedrich Weinwurm (30 August 1885, Borský Mikuláš – 1942) was a Slovak architect and key figure of Slovak modernist architecture.

Work 
 Nová doba Estate
 Housing complex Unitas

References 

1885 births
1942 deaths
People from Senica District
Slovak Jews
Slovak architects
20th-century Slovak people
20th-century Hungarian architects
Modernist architects
Hungarian Jews